Datuk Arumugam Rengasamy (also known as Spiderman) was a legendary Malaysian national football player from Selangor. His long arms and difficult saves earned him the nickname "Spiderman". He was inducted into the FIFA Century Club in May 2021.

Career
He made his debut for Selangor FA when he was 18 years old in the Burnley Cup youth competition in 1971. He represented Selangor FA in the Malaysia Cup
tournament from 1972 to 1988, a period during which Selangor FA won the Malaysia Cup eight times.

International
R. Arumugam was called up to the Malaysian national football team in 1973 for the World Cup qualifying round matches in Seoul, South Korea. During his time with the national team, Malaysia won the Merdeka Tournament in 1973, 1974, 1976, 1979 and 1986. He also represented Malaysia in the 1973, 1975, 1977, 1979, 1981, 1983 and 1985 Sea Games. He won a bronze medal with the national team during the 1974 Asian Games in Tehran. Malaysia also qualified for the 1980 Moscow Olympic Games, but Malaysia decided to boycott the Games. R. Arumugam earned 196 caps (not all A class international matches), 142 matches is against full national team. His personal goal was to earn 200 caps. He retired in 1986.

In 2022, IFFHS list him on their list of the top 25 goalkeepers with most clean-sheets in national team which he had a total of 50 clean-sheets and the first Southeast Asia player to do so.

After retirement
In 1983, he formed his own club, Starbrite SC, as part of his personal contribution to the youngsters in his housing area.

Death and legacy
R. Arumugam died in a car accident at Federal Highway near Petaling Jaya on 18 December 1988. His wife, Maria Selvie survived the incident with his two daughters, Subha Arumugam and Rubha Arumugam.

In recognition of his services to both state and nation, the Football Association of Selangor and Public Bank, where Arumugam had been employed, started a trust fund in his name on 5 January 1989. On 4 June 2011, Yang Dipertuan Agong posthumously awarded him the Panglima Jasa Negara (PJN), which carries the title "Datuk".

The character of Muthu Kumar in Ola Bola, a 2016 film chronicling the Malaysian national team's road to the 1980 Olympic qualifiers, was based on Arumugam.

Honours

Club 
F.A. Selangor 
 First Division (1):
 Champion: 1984
 Malaysia Cup (8):
 Winner: 1973, 1975, 1976, 1979, 1981, 1982, 1984, 1986
 Charity Cup (Sultan Haji Ahmad Shah Cup) (2):
 Winner: 1985, 1987

International 
 Pestabola Merdeka (5)
Winners: 1973, 1974, 1976, 1979, 1986
 SEA Games (2)
Winners: 1977, 1979
Runners-up: 1981
 Asian Games
Bronze Medal: 1974

Individual 
 AFC Asian All Stars: 1982, 1985
 AFC Century Club Awards 1999
 OCM Hall of Fame 2004
 Ex-State & Ex-National Footballers Association of Malaysia Honour: 2011
 Goal.com The best Malaysia XI of all time: 2020

Records 
 Malaysia national football team  all-time most clean-sheets: 50
 Southeast Asia all-time most clean-sheets in national team: 50
 The first Asian footballers to reach 50 clean-sheets in national team: (1973–1986)

Orders
  : 
 Member of the Order of the Defender of the Realm (A.M.N.) (1980)
 Commander of the Order of Meritorious Service (P.J.N.) — Datuk (2011—posthumously)

See also
 List of men's footballers with 100 or more international caps

References

External links
 Biodata at Selangorfc.com 
  Biodata at F.A.S Online

1953 births
1988 deaths
Malaysian sportspeople of Indian descent
Malaysian footballers
Malaysia international footballers
Commanders of the Order of Meritorious Service
Members of the Order of the Defender of the Realm
1976 AFC Asian Cup players
People from Selangor
Malaysian Hindus
Tamil sportspeople
Malaysian people of Tamil descent
Selangor FA players
Association football goalkeepers
Asian Games bronze medalists for Malaysia
Asian Games medalists in football
Southeast Asian Games gold medalists for Malaysia
Southeast Asian Games silver medalists for Malaysia
Southeast Asian Games bronze medalists for Malaysia
Southeast Asian Games medalists in football
Medalists at the 1974 Asian Games
Competitors at the 1973 Southeast Asian Peninsular Games
Footballers at the 1974 Asian Games
FIFA Century Club